Police Station No. 3 is a registered historic building in Cincinnati, Ohio, listed in the National Register on May 18, 1981.

The Cincinnati Police Station at 3201 Warsaw Avenue opened December 31, 1908.  It was a combined station house and patrol house, which accommodated 40 patrolmen, a patrol wagon, and 16 horses for mounted patrol. Designated the Ninth District and Patrol Nine upon opening, it was re-designated as District 3 in 1927.

On December 14, 2008, community groups joined with the police department and the Greater Cincinnati Police Historical Society to celebrate the building's centennial.  A plaque on front of the building commemorates that event.   District 3's operations moved from this building to a new station in June 2015. The station on Warsaw Avenue station is still used by Cincinnati Police Traffic Units.

Notes 

National Register of Historic Places in Cincinnati
Buildings and structures in Cincinnati
Government buildings on the National Register of Historic Places in Ohio
Police stations on the National Register of Historic Places